The Dartford Cable Tunnel is a 2.4 km utility tunnel beneath the Thames, upstream of the Dartford Crossing. With a diameter of ~, it carries a 400 kV National Grid electrical transmission cable. It is accessible by foot as a crossing of the Thames, but by authorised personnel only. It was built in 2003–04 at a cost of £11 million (equivalent to £ million in ).

See also
400 kV Thames Crossing
Thames Cable Tunnel
Utility vault
Crossings of the River Thames
Tunnels underneath the River Thames

References

Infrastructure in London
Dartford
Tunnels underneath the River Thames
Tunnels completed in 2004